Alun Jones may refer to:

Alun Jones (tennis), Australian tennis player
Al Jones (English musician), born Alun Jones, UK folk-rock musician
Alun Gwynne Jones, Baron Chalfont (1919–2020), British politician
Alun Ffred Jones (born 1959), Welsh politician
Alun Wyn Jones (born 1985), Welsh rugby union player

See also
Alun Ashworth-Jones, a 1969 Parlophone album by Al Jones
Alan Jones (disambiguation)
Allan Jones (disambiguation)
Allen Jones (disambiguation)
Al Jones (disambiguation)